The Taiwan Exposition: In Commemoration of the First Forty Years of Colonial Rule was an exhibition held in Taihoku Prefecture in 1935, the 10th year of Hirohito's reign, to mark 40 years of the establishment of Japanese Formosa (now Taiwan).

The exhibition ran from 10 October 1935 for 50 days until 28 November, and was attended by over a million people.
The Governor-General Nakagawa Kenzō and Director of General Affairs Hiroyoshi Hirasuka presided over the exhibition.

Exhibition sites
The organisers were unable to find a suitable single site for the exhibition, and originally selected two sites in Zhongshan District, with a third in the more remote Beitou hot springs area. But, following concerns that this was too focused in the city centre one in Daitōtei was added,

Zhongshan Hall area, Ximending 
The first area was in front of the recently completed Taipei Zhongshan Hall, Ximending, hosted the large ceremonies, showed Taiwanese agriculture, forestry, railway construction, mining, sugar and telecoms; displays from Japan, Korea and Manchuria and Japanese businesses including Mitsui & Co. and Nippon Steel Corp.. It was 4.29 hectares big.

There were displays from Formosa itself, Japan, Korea and Manchuria.

National Taiwan Museum area
The "First Cultural Pavilion" was housed in what is now the Taiwan National Museum. It was 7.93 hectares big.

Beitou hot springs
A site away from Taipei in the Beitou hot springs area was used to promote tourist attractions in Taiwan and plans for Datun National Park (now Yangmingshan National Park) and was housed in a "'Grass Mountain Exhibition Hall".

Daitōtei
The first two areas were both central Taipei, which led to local gentry making a request for a third exhibition area elsewhere in Taipei, in Daitōtei (now Twatutia).

This area hosted the "South Pavilion" which showed products from Siam (Thailand), the Philippines province and the Fujian Province, along with information about plans for Japan's future expansion.

Entertainments intended to attract Taiwanese people to this section included the opera performer Mei Lanfang, a Mazu parade and a Peking opera group.

Attendance
It is estimated that over a million people attended the fair, with 2,750,000 individual visits to the several exhibition halls.

References

1935 in Taiwan
Colonial exhibitions
Events in Taipei
World's fairs in Taiwan